Jeddah, alternatively transliterated as Jedda, Jiddah or Jidda, is a city in the Hejaz region of western Saudi Arabia and the country's commercial center. It is not known when Jeddah was founded, but Jeddah's prominence grew in 647 when the Caliph Uthman made it a travel hub serving Muslim travelers going for Islamic pilgrimage to the holy city of Mecca. Since those times, Jeddah has served as the gateway for millions of pilgrims who have arrived in Saudi Arabia, traditionally by sea and recently by air. With a population of about 4,697,000 people as of 2021, Jeddah is the largest city in Makkah Province, the largest city in Hejaz, the second-largest city in the Saudi Arabia (after the capital Riyadh), and the ninth-largest in the Middle East. It also serves as the administrative centre of the OIC. Jeddah Islamic Port, on the Red Sea, is the thirty-sixth largest seaport in the world and the second-largest and second-busiest seaport in the Middle East (after Dubai's Port of Jebel Ali).

Economically, Jeddah is focusing on further developing capital investment in scientific and engineering leadership within Saudi Arabia, and the Middle East. Jeddah was ranked fourth in the Africa, Middle East, and 'stan countries region in the Innovation Cities Index in 2009.

Jeddah is one of the Saudi Arabia's primary resort cities and was named a Beta world city by the Globalization and World Cities Study Group and Network (GaWC). Given the city's close proximity to the Red Sea, fishing and seafood dominate the food culture unlike other parts of the country. In Arabic, the city motto is "Jeddah Ghair", which translates to "Jeddah is different". The motto has been widely used among both locals as well as foreign visitors.

Etymology and spelling
There are at least two etymologies of Jeddah, according to Jeddah Ibn Al-Qudaa'iy, the chief of the Quda'a clan. The more common account has it that the name is derived from  Jaddah, the Arabic word for "grandmother". According to eastern folk belief, the Tomb of Eve, considered the grandmother of humanity, is located in Jeddah.

The Maghrebi traveler Ibn Battuta visited Jeddah during his world trip in around 1330. He wrote the name of the city into his diary as "Jiddah".

The British Foreign and Commonwealth Office and other branches of the British government formerly used the older spelling of "Jedda", contrary to other English-speaking usages, but in 2007, it changed to the spelling "Jeddah".

T. E. Lawrence felt that any transcription of Arabic names into English was arbitrary. In his book, Revolt in the Desert, Jeddah is spelled in three different ways on the first page alone.

On official Saudi maps and documents, the city name is transcribed "Jeddah", which is now the prevailing usage.

History

Pre-Islam
Traces of early activity in the area are testified by some Thamudic inscriptions that were excavated in Wadi Briman, east of the city, and Wadi Boweb, northwest of the city. The oldest Mashrabiya found in Jeddah dates back to the pre-Islamic era.

Some believe that Jeddah had been inhabited before Alexander the Great, who had a naval expedition to the Red Sea, by fishermen in the Red Sea, who considered it a center from which they sailed out into the sea as well as a place for relaxation and well-being. According to the Ministry of Hajj, Jeddah has been settled for more than 2500 years.

Excavations in the old city have been interpreted as that Jeddah was founded as a fishing hamlet by the Yemeni Quda'a tribe, who left central Yemen to settle in Makkah after the collapse of Sad (dam) Marib Dam in Yemen in 115 BC.

Under the Caliphates
Jeddah first achieved prominence around AD 647, when the third Muslim Caliph, Uthman Ibn Affan, turned it into a port making it the port of Makkah instead of Al Shoaib port southwest of Mecca.

The Umayyads inherited the entire Rashidun Caliphate including Hejaz and ruled from 661AD to 750AD. In AD 702, Jeddah was briefly occupied by pirates from the Kingdom of Axum. However, Jeddah remained a key civilian harbor, serving fishermen and pilgrims travelling by sea for the Hajj. It is also believed that Sharifdom of Mecca, an honorary Viceroy to the holy land, was first appointed in this period of the Islamic Caliphate . Jeddah has been established as the main city of the historic Hijaz province and a historic port for pilgrims arriving by sea to perform their Hajj pilgrimage in Mecca.

In 750, in the Abbasid Revolution, the Abbasids successfully took control of almost the whole Umayyad Empire, excluding Morocco (Maghrib) and Spain (Al-Andalus). From 876, Jeddah and the surrounding area became the object of wars between the Abbasids and the Tulunids of Egypt, who at one point gained control of the emirates of Egypt, Syria, Jordan and Hejaz. The power struggle between the Tulunid Governors and the Abbasids over Hejaz lasted for nearly 25 years, until the Tulunids finally withdrew from Arabia in 900 AD.

In 930 AD, the main Hejazi cities of Medina, Mecca and Taif were heavily sacked by the Qarmatians. It is probable, though not historically confirmed, that Jeddah itself was attacked by Qarmatians.

Soon after, in early 935, the Ikhshidids, the new power in Egypt, took control of the Hejaz region. There are no historical records that detail the Ikhshidid rule of Hejaz. At this point in time, Jeddah was still unfortified and without walls.

The Fatimids, Ayyubids, and Mamluks

In 969 AD, the Fatimids from Algeria took control in Egypt from the Ikhshidid Governors of Abbasids and expanded their empire to the surrounding regions, including The Hijaz and Jeddah. The Fatimids developed an extensive trade network in both the Mediterranean and the Indian Ocean through the Red Sea. Their trade and diplomatic ties extended all the way to China and its Song Dynasty, which eventually determined the economic course of Tihamah during the High Middle Ages.

After Saladin's conquest of Jerusalem in 1171, he proclaimed himself sultan of Egypt, after dissolving the Fatimid Caliphate upon the death of al-Adid, thus establishing the Ayyubid dynasty. Ayyubid conquests in Hejaz included Jeddah, which joined the Ayyubid Empire in 1177 during the leadership of Sharif Ibn Abul-Hashim Al-Thalab (1094–1201). During their relatively short-lived tenure, the Ayyubids ushered in an era of economic prosperity in the lands they ruled and the facilities and patronage provided by the Ayyubids led to a resurgence in intellectual activity in the Islamic world. This period was also marked by an Ayyubid process of vigorously strengthening Sunni Muslim dominance in the region by constructing numerous madrasas (Islamic schools) in their major cities. Jeddah attracted Muslim sailors and merchants from Sindh, Southeast Asia and East Africa, and other distant regions.

In 1254, following events in Cairo and the dissolution of the Ayyubid Empire, Hejaz became a part of the Mamluk Sultanate.

The Portuguese explorer Vasco da Gama, having found his way around the Cape and obtained pilots from the coast of Zanzibar in AD 1497, pushed his way across the Indian Ocean to the shores of Malabar and Calicut, attacked fleets that carried freight and Muslim pilgrims from India to the Red Sea, and struck terror into the surrounding potentates.  The Princes of Gujarat and Yemen turned for help to Egypt. Sultan Al-Ashraf Qansuh al-Ghawri accordingly fitted out a fleet of 50 vessels under the Governor of Jeddah, Hussein the Kurd (aka. Mirocem). Jeddah was soon fortified with a wall, using forced labor, as a harbor of refuge from the Portuguese, allowing Arabia and the Red Sea to be protected.

Ottoman Empire

In 1517, the Ottoman Turks conquered the Mamluk Sultanate in Egypt and Syria, during the reign of Selim I.

The Ottomans rebuilt the weak walls of Jeddah in 1525 following the defense of the city against the Lopo Soares de Albergaria's Armada at the Siege of Jeddah (1517). The new stone wall included six watchtowers and six city gates. They were constructed to defend against the Portuguese attack. Of the six gates, the Gate of Mecca was the eastern gate and the Gate of Al-Magharibah, facing the port, was the western gate. The Gate of Sharif faced south. The other gates were the Gate of Al-Bunt, Gate of Al-Sham (also called Gate of Al-Sharaf), and Gate of Medina, facing north. The Turks also built The Qishla of Jeddah, a small castle for the city soldiers. In the 19th century, these seven gates were minimized into four giant gates with four towers. These giant gates were the Gate of Sham to the north, the Gate of Mecca to the east, the Gate of Sharif to the south, and the Gate of Al-Magharibah on the seaside.

Jeddah became a direct Ottoman Eyalet, while the remaining Hejaz under Sharif Barakat II became a Vassal state to the Ottoman Empire 8 years after the Siege of Jeddah in 1517, the Portuguese attempt for the second time in 1541 to attack Portuguese but was Repulsed.

Parts of the city wall still survive today in the old city. Even though the Portuguese were successfully repelled from the city, fleets in the Indian Ocean were at their mercy. This was evidenced by the Battle of Diu. The Portuguese soldiers' cemetery can still be found within the old city today and is referred to as the site of the Christian Graves.

Ahmed Al-Jazzar, the Ottoman military man mainly known for his role in the Siege of Acre, spent the earlier part of his career at Jeddah. In Jeddah in 1750, he killed some seventy rioting nomads in retaliation for the killing of his commander, Abdullah Beg, earning him the nickname "Jezzar" (butcher).

On 15 June 1858, rioting in the city, believed to have been instigated by a former police chief in reaction to British policy in the Red Sea, led to the massacre of 25 Christians, including the British and French consuls, members of their families, and wealthy Greek merchants. The British frigate , anchored at port, bombarded the city for two days in retaliation.

First Saudi State and Ottoman–Saudi War

In 1802, Nejdi forces conquered both Mecca and Jeddah from the Ottomans. When Sharif Ghalib Efendi informed Sultan Mahmud II of this, the Sultan ordered his Egyptian viceroy Muhammad Ali Pasha to retake the city. Muhammad Ali successfully regained the city in the Battle of Jeddah in 1813.

World War I and the Hashemite Kingdom

During World War I, Sharif Hussein bin Ali declared a revolt against the Ottoman Empire, seeking independence from the Ottoman Turks and the creation of a single unified Arab state spanning from Aleppo in Syria to Aden in Yemen.

King Hussein declared the Kingdom of Hejaz. Later, Hussein was involved in a war with Ibn Saud, who was the Sultan of Nejd. Hussein abdicated following the fall of Mecca, in December 1924, and his son Ali bin Hussein became the new king.

Kingdom of Saudi Arabia

A few months later, Ibn Saud, whose clan originated in the central Nejd province, conquered Medina and Jeddah via an agreement with Jeddans following the Second Battle of Jeddah. He deposed Ali bin Hussein, who fled to Baghdad, eventually settling in Amman, Jordan, where his descendants became part of its Hashemite royalty.

As a result, Jeddah came under the sway of the Al-Saud dynasty in December 1925. In 1926, Ibn Saud added the title King of Hejaz to his position of Sultan of Nejd. Today, Jeddah has lost its historical role in peninsular politics after Jeddah fell within the new province of Makkah, whose provincial capital is the city of Mecca.

From 1928 to 1932, the new Khuzam Palace was built as the new residence of King Abdul Aziz in Jeddah. The palace lies south of the old walled city and was constructed under the supervision of the engineer Mohammed bin Awad bin Laden. After 1963, the palace was used as a royal guest house; since 1995, it has housed the Regional Museum of Archaeology and Ethnography.

The remaining walls and gates of the old city were demolished in 1947. A fire in 1982 destroyed some ancient buildings in the old town center, called Al-Balad, but much is still preserved. A house-by-house survey of the old districts was made in 1979, showing that some 1000 traditional buildings still existed, though the number of structures with great historic value was far less. In 1990, a Jeddah Historical Area Preservation Department was founded.

The modern city has expanded wildly beyond its old boundaries.

In October 2021, Saudi authorities, led be Mohammad bin Salman, initiated a large-scale demolition and eviction plan in neighborhoods in the southern part of Jeddah to make way for the Jeddah Central Project, a revitalization project under Saudi Vision 2030. The demolitions affected 558,000 people in more than 60 neighborhoods. Amnesty International confirmed through official documents that some of the residents were notified about evictions only 24 hours before, while others were between 1–6 weeks. In some cases "evacuate" was written on the buildings, while the state media and billboards informed others about the demolitions to others. Saudi state media claimed the majority of affected neighborhoods were "rife with diseases, crime, drugs and theft" and home to predominantly undocumented immigrants. In January 2022, Saudi authorities announced a compensation scheme that accounted for 47% of those evicted.

Geography

Jeddah is located in Saudi Arabia's Red Sea coastal plain (called Tihamah). Jeddah lies in the Hijazi Tihama region which is in the lower Hijaz mountains. Historically, politically and culturally, Jeddah was a major city of Hejaz Vilayet, the Kingdom of Hejaz and other regional political entities according to Hijazi history books. It is the 100th largest city in the world by land area.

Climate
Jeddah features an arid climate (BWh) under Koppen's climate classification, with a tropical temperature range. Summers are also quite steamy, with dew points often exceeding , particularly in September. Rainfall in Jeddah is generally sparse, and usually occurs in small amounts in November and December. Heavy thunderstorms are common in winter.

Dust storms happen in summer and sometimes in winter, coming from the Arabian Peninsula's deserts or from North Africa. Occasionally, the dust storms accompany thunderstorms.

Economy

Jeddah has long been a port city. Even before being designated the port city for Mecca, Jeddah was a trading hub for the region. In the 19th century, goods such as mother-of-pearl, tortoise shells, frankincense, and spices were routinely exported from the city. Apart from this, many imports into the city were destined for further transit to the Suez, Africa, or Europe. Many goods passing through Jeddah could not even be found in the city or even in Arabia.

All of the capitals of the Middle East and North Africa are within two hours flying distance of Jeddah, making it the second commercial center of the Middle East after Dubai.

Also, Jeddah's industrial district is the fourth largest industrial city in Saudi Arabia after Riyadh, Jubail and Yanbu.

King Abdullah Street

King Abdullah Street is one of the most important streets in Jeddah and runs from King Fahd Road by the waterfront in the west of Jeddah to the eastern end of the city. It is famous for hosting numerous corporate offices and commercial developments. It will be near the HSR Entrance in Jeddah central train station which connects Jeddah with Makkah, AL-Madinah, and King Abdullah Economic City (KAEC). And it also has the tallest flagpole in the world at a height of 170 m (558 ft). This road also faced a catastrophe in 2011 when it was submerged with rainwater.

Tahliyah Street

Tahaliyah Street is an important fashion and shopping street in central Jeddah. It contains many upscale departments and high fashion brands stores as well as boutiques. It has been renamed "Prince Mohammad bin Abdul Aziz Road" by the government, but this official name is not widely used. It also has many fine dining options.

Madinah Road
Madinah Road is a historically significant street in Jeddah. It links the Southern districts with the North and contains the Main offices of several companies and showrooms. The northern end of the road links to the King Abdul Aziz Int'l Airport, which is a contributing factor to heavy traffic on this road at most times during the day.

Culture

Religious significance

Most citizens are Sunni Muslims. The government, courts, and civil and criminal laws enforce a moral code established by Shari'ah. A very small minority of Saudi citizens are Shia Muslims, and there is also a large foreign workforce.

The city has over 1,300 mosques. The law does not allow other religions' buildings, books, icons, and expressions of faith. However, private religious observance not involving Muslims nor offending public order and morality is tolerated.

Since the 7th century, Jeddah has hosted millions of Muslim pilgrims from all over the world on their way to Hajj. This merge with pilgrims has a major impact on the society, religion, and economy of Jeddah.

Cuisine

Jeddah's multi-ethnic citizenry has influenced Jeddah's traditional cuisine.

Some dishes are native to the Hejaz, like Saleeg and Mabshūr is a white-rice dish, cooked in broth, often made with chicken instead of lamb meat. Jeddah cuisine is popular as well and dishes like, Foul, Shorabah Hareira (Hareira soup), Mugalgal, Madhbi (chicken grilled on stone), Madfun (literally meaning "buried"), Magloobah, Kibdah, Manzalah (usually eaten at Eid ul-Fitr), Magliya (a local version of falafel) and Saiyadyia which can be acquired in many traditional restaurants around the city, such as Althamrat, Abo-Zaid, Al-Quarmooshi, Ayaz, and Hejaziyat.

Some were imported from other Saudi regions like Kabsa from Najd, Arīka and Ma'sūb from the southern Saudi region. Other Dishes were imported from other cultures through Saudis of different origins, like Mantu, Yaghmush and Ruz Bukhāri from Central Asia, Burēk and Šurēk and Kabab almīru from Turkey and the Balkans, Mandi from Yemen, Mutabbag from Yemen-Malaysia, Biryāni and Kābli rice dishes from South Asia.

The most popular local fast-food chain, begun in 1974, is Albaik, with branches in Jeddah and the neighboring cities of Makkah, Madinah and Yanbu. Their main dish is broasted (broiled and roasted) chicken, commonly known by Jeddawis as "Broast", and a variety of seafood.The popular fast food chain recently opened branches in Riyadh. Dammam, Buraidah, Bahrain, and Dubai in the UAE.

Open-air art

During the oil boom in the late 1970s and 1980s, there was a focused civic effort led by the then city's mayor Mohamed Said Farsi  to bring art to Jeddah's public areas. As a result, Jeddah contains a large number of modern open-air sculptures and works of art, typically situated in roundabouts, making the city one of the largest open-air art galleries in the world. Sculptures include works by Jean/Hans Arp, César Baldaccini, Alexander Calder, Henry Moore, Joan Miró, Hubert Minnebo and Victor Vasarely. They often depict traditional Saudi items such as coffee pots, incense burners, palm trees, etc. The fact that Islamic tradition prohibits the depiction of living creatures, notably the human form, has made for some very creative, as well as bizarre, modern art. These include a giant geometry set, a giant bicycle, and a huge block of concrete with several cars protruding from it at odd angles and a monumental sculpture by Aref Rayess called "Swords of God (Soyuf Allah)". At the interchange between Al-Madinah Road, King Abdulaziz Road, and Prince Abullah Al-Faisal Road, there are large sculptures of camels that are the center of a very dangerous roundabout. The camel bodies are not full; they are broken up to prevent it portraying living creatures, which is against Wahhabi belief.

Museums and collections
There are about a dozen museums or collections in Jeddah, with varied educational aims and professionalism. These include the Jeddah Regional Museum of Archaeology and Ethnography run by the Deputy Ministry of Antiquities and Museums, the Jeddah Municipal Museum, the Nasseef House, the Humane Heritage Museum, the private Abdul Rauf Hasan Khalil Museum and the private Arts Heritage Museum.

Events and festivals

Red Sea International Film Festival 
Jeddah has been selected as a place for the annual Red Sea International Film Festival that will be held in 2020.

Jeddah International Book Fair 
Jeddah hosts an annual international book fair called Jeddah international book fair. It is the second largest book fair in Saudi Arabia, and it was first held in 2015. The book fair is held annually in early December.

Jeddah Season 
Jeddah Season is a part of the Saudi government's Saudi Seasons initiatives that aims at launching a high-level tourism activities in Saudi Arabia. The first version of the season has been held in June–July 2019. Around 150 activities and events have been organized in five destinations in Jeddah. As Saudi Seasons 2019 aims at shedding the light on the diverse Saudi culture and heritage. Jeddah was chosen because it is one of the most culturally-rich Saudi cities with a history that spans over 3,000 years. Most of Jeddah Season's events and activities have been held at King Abdullah Sports City, Jeddah's historical area, Al-Hamra Corniche, and the Jeddah Waterfront.
Jeddah Season aim to make Jeddah the most preferred tourist destination in the world and the best season of Saudi Seasons.

Media
Jeddah is served by four major Arabic-language newspapers, Asharq Al-Awsat, Al Madina, Okaz, and Al Bilad, as well as two major English-language newspapers, the Saudi Gazette and Arab News. Okaz and Al-Madina are the primary newspapers of Jeddah and some other Saudi cities, with over a million readers; their focus is mainly local.

Internet blogs specifically informative of the locality are abundant in Jeddah, catering mostly to the widespread expatriate population. Of these are constituted websites that have garnered international acclaim for informativeness, such as Jeddah Blog, the recipient of the Bronze Expat Blog Award in 2012 and the Gold Award in 2013 and is among Feedspot's Top 100 Middle East blogs. Other amateur websites catering to specific topics in the region exist as well.

Jeddah represents the largest radio and television market in Saudi Arabia. Television stations serving the city area include Saudi TV1, Saudi TV2, Saudi TV Sports, Al Ekhbariya, the ART channels network and hundreds of cable, satellite, and other specialty television providers.

Accent

The Jeddah region's distinctive speech pattern is called the Hejazi dialect; it is among the most recognizable accents within the Arabic language.

Cityscape

Old Jeddah

The Old City known as Al-Balad with its traditional multistory buildings and merchant houses, that often still belong to the families that inhabited them before the oil-era, has lost ground to more modern developments. Nonetheless, the Old City contributes to Hejazi's cultural identity. Since it has been granted UNESCO World Heritage status, in 2014, several traditional buildings have been restored and made open to the public. In 2019, the Saudi crown prince, Muhammad bin Salman, has issued a royal decree that orders The Ministry of Culture to restore 50 historical buildings in Jeddah. Several historic mosques from different eras are located in al-Balad, as well as one of oldest museums in the city, called Bayt Naseef or Naseef house, displaying local furniture and interior design of the past 150 years, approximately.

Resorts and hotels
The city has many popular resorts, including Durrat Al-Arus, Al-Nawras Mövenpick resort at the Red Sea Corniche, Crystal Resort, Radisson Blu, The Signature Al Murjan Beach Resort, Al Nakheel Village, Sands, and Sheraton Abhur. Many are renowned for their preserved Red Sea marine life and offshore coral reefs.

Consulates
One of two consulates of the United States of America in Saudi Arabia is located in Jeddah, along with the consulates for 67 other countries such as Afghanistan, the United Kingdom, Indonesia, France, Germany, Greece, Turkey, Philippines, India, Pakistan, Bangladesh, Italy, Russia and Mainland China. Some of the other consulates present include, countries of the Organisation of Islamic Cooperation and the Arab League states.

Historical Jeddah 

Historical Jeddah is situated on the eastern shore of the Red Sea. From the 7th century AD, it was established as a major port for Indian Ocean trade routes, channeling goods to Mecca. It was also the gateway for Muslim pilgrims to Mecca who arrived by sea. These twin roles saw the city develop into a thriving multicultural center, characterized by a distinctive architectural tradition, including tower houses built in the late 19th century by the city's mercantile elites, and combining Red Sea coastal coral building traditions with influences and crafts from along the trade routes.

Within a defensive wall that was built during Ottoman rule, the old city of Jeddah, Al-Balad, was divided into districts, or Haras, where business and trade centered around traditional souks, or market places, and khans, covered markets that were generally connected to shops.

Harrat Al-Mathloum (District of the Wronged) 
Located in the North East, this district was named after Abdulkarim Al-Barzangi, a Hijazi rebel who was crucified by the Ottomans, some of its landmarks are: 

 Dar Al-Qabil
 Dar Al-Ba'ashin
 Dar Al-Sheikh
 Al-Shafi'i Mosque The oldest mosque in town, its minaret was built in the 13th century, and its pillars date back to Ottoman rule.
 Mosque of Uthman bin Affan Also called the Ebony Mosque because of its two ebony pillars, it was mentioned in the writings of Ibn Battuta and Ibn Jubayr.
 Al-Mia'mar Mosque An old mosque built in the 17th century.
 Souq Al-Jama One of the oldest markets in town.

Harrat Al-Sham (The Levantine District) 
Located in the north and named after its orientation, some of its landmarks are:

 Dar Al-Sadat
 Dar Al-Serti
 Dar Al-Zahid
 Dar Al-Banajah
 Al-Basha Mosque

Built by Bakr Basha, the governor of Jeddah in 1735.

Harrat Al-Yemen (The Yemeni District) 

Located in the south and is also named after its orientation, its landmarks include:

 Beit Nasseef By far the most famous site in the old town, it was built in 1881 for Omar Nassif Efendi, governor of Jeddah at the time, and served as the royal residence of King Abdulaziz after conquering the city.
 Dar Al-Jamjoom
 Dar Al-Sha'araoui
 Dar Al-Abdulsamad
 Dar Al-Kayal
 Beit Al-Matbouli
 Beit Al-Joghadar

Harrat Al-Bahar (The Seafront District) 
Located in the southwest, some of its landmarks are:

 Dar Al-Nas
 Dar Al-Radwan
 Dar Al-Nimr

Main sights

Abdul Raouf Khalil Museum 
Founded by Sheikh Abdul Raouf Khalil in 1996, this museum not only presents the rich Islamic cultural heritage of the city but also its pre-Islamic history that goes back to 2500 years; it traces the various civilizations that inhabited the region. Located in the downtown district, it boasts of large collection of items and artifacts belonging to the Ottoman Turks and the fishermen tribes who were the first inhabitants of the region.

King Fahd's Fountain

The fountain was donated to the City of Jeddah by the late King Fahd bin Abdul Aziz, after whom it was named.

Al-Rahmah Mosque 

Sometimes referred to as the floating mosque because of it being built above water, this fascinating mix of the old architecture and the new was built in 1985. It is a popular spot among tourists and natives looking to lounge by the seaside.

Al-Jawhara Stadium

Is a new stadium launched in 2014, located north of Jeddah, is used mostly for football, reaching a full capacity of 62,241 spectators. It is the largest stadium in Jeddah, and the second-largest in Saudi Arabia.

King Saud Mosque 

The largest mosque in the city. Built in 1987, it displays beautiful Islamic architecture and was built by Egyptian architect Abdel Wahed El Wakil.

NCB Tower

IDB Tower

The Islamic Development Bank is a multilateral development financing institution. It was founded by the first conference of Finance Ministers of the Organisation of the Islamic Conference (OIC, now the Organisation of Islamic Cooperation), convened 18 December 1973. The bank officially began its activities on 20 October 1975.

Jeddah Municipality Tower

This is the headquarters of the metropolitan area of Jeddah. The municipality's new building is going to be not only Jeddah's tallest but is also going to dethrone the Burj Khalifa.

Upon its completion, it will be the tallest skyscraper in the world. The building has been scaled down from its initial  proposal, since the ground proved unsuitable for a building that tall, to a height of at least  (the exact height is being kept private while in development, similar to the Burj Khalifa), which, at about one kilometer, would still make it by far the tallest building or structure in the world to date, standing at least  taller than the Burj Khalifa in Dubai. Construction began in April 2013 and there was steady progress, but in January 2018, building owner JEC halted structural concrete work with the tower about one-third completed due to labor issues with a contractor following the 2017–19 Saudi Arabian purge. JEC had said they planned to restart construction in 2020.

King Road Tower

King Road Tower is a commercial and office building, the external walls of which are used to show commercials. The building also has a helipad on its roof. King Road Tower has the largest LED display in the world on its walls.

Al Jawharah Tower

Al Jawharah Tower is a residential high-rise under construction. It became the third-tallest structure in Jeddah when completed in 2014.

Jeddah Flagpole

The King Abdullah Square on the intersection of Andalus Road with King Abdullah Road had the world's tallest flagpole. On the 84th Saudi Arabia National Day, September 23, 2014, the flagpole hoisted a huge Saudi flag before a crowd of thousands. The flagpole succeeded Dushanbe Flagpole as the tallest flagpole in the world until 26 December 2021, when the Cairo Flagpole in Cairo, Egypt was erected at a height of 201.952 m (662.57 ft).

Entrance of Mecca
Bab Makkah, also known as Makkah Gate, is a limestone coral gateway that leads into the historic Al-Balad district of Jeddah.

The Mecca Gate, named the "Quran Gate", is located 60 km outside Jeddah on the Makkah Mukkarram road of the Jeddah - Mecca Highway. It is the entrance to Mecca and the birthplace of Muhammad. The gate signifies the boundary of the Haram area of the city of Mecca, where non-Muslims are prohibited to enter. The gate was designed in 1979 by Egyptian architect Samir Elabd for the architectural firm IDEA Center. The structure is that of a book, representing the Quran, sitting on a rehal, or book stand.

Jeddah waterfront

It has many facilities including swimming beaches, huts, floating marina dock, washrooms, restaurants, parks, dancing fountains, playgrounds, and access to wifi.

This project of developing the Jeddah Waterfront has been awarded the Jeddah Innovation Award of the year 1439H in the field of government innovation, by the Jeddah Governorate.

Education

Schools, colleges and universities

, Jeddah had 849 public and private schools for male students and another 1,179 public and private schools for female students. The medium of instruction in both public and private schools is typically Arabic, with emphasis on English as a second language. However, some private schools administered by foreign entities conduct classes in English. These include 10+ Indian schools following the CBSE board of education system, several Pakistani and Bangladeshi schools as well. , Jeddah also had four Philippine international schools, with two more scheduled to open shortly afterward.

Jeddah's universities and colleges include the following:

 King Saud bin Abdulaziz University for Health Sciences
 King Abdulaziz University
 King Abdullah University of Science and Technology
 University of Jeddah
 Arab Open University
 Dar Al-Hekma College
 Effat University
 University of Business and Technology (UBT)
 Teacher's College
 Jeddah College of Technology
 Jeddah Private College
 College of Health Care
 College of Telecom & Electronics
 College of Community
 Private College of Business
 Ibn Sina National College for Medical Studies
 Batterjee Medical College
 Prince Sultan College of Tourism
 Prince Sultan Aviation Academy
 Islamic Fiqh Academy
 Jeddah Institute for Speech and Hearing
 Saudi German Institute for Nursing

Jeddah is also home to several primary, intermediate and secondary schools such as:

 Jeddah Knowledge International School
 American International School of Jeddah
 Italian international school
 Jeddah International School
 Zahrat Al-Sahraa International school (ZSIS)
 Cedar International School
 British International School of Jeddah (Continental, BISJ)
 German International School Jeddah
 Al-Thager Model School
 International Indian School Jeddah (IISJ)
 Pakistan International School Jeddah (PISJ)
 Talal International School Jeddah (TISJ) 
 DPS Jeddah Al-Falah International School
 International Philippine School in Jeddah
 Jeddah Japanese School
 Korean International School of Jeddah (KISJ; 젯다한국국제학교)
 Al-Waha International School
 Beladi International School Jeddah
 Al-Afaq International School
 Manarat Jeddah Schools
 Gharnatah International School
 New Al Wurood International School Jeddah [NAWIS]
 Bangladesh International School Jeddah (BISESJ)
 Bader International School
 Nobles International School (NIS)
 Dauha Al Uloom International School (DAUISJ)
 Al-Fath Schools
 Al-Aqsa Private Schools
 Dar Al-Fikr Schools (DAF)
 Al-Fanar School Jeddah
 Dar Al-Thikr Schools
 Hala International School (HIS)
 Jeddah International Turkish School (JITS)
 Jeddah Prep and Grammar School (JPGS) 
 Al Hamraa Girls' School
 Building Blocks (private school)
 Dar Jana International School (DJIS)
 Al Mawarid International School Jeddah [AMIS]
 Pioneer International School
 Duaa International School Jeddah (DISJ)
 Jeddah Private School (JPS)
 Nhaond School
 Number 18 High School
 Number 25 Secondary School
 Tuletelah High School
 Bangladesh International School And College (Bangla Section) Jeddah (BISCJ)
 Al-Afkar International School
 Waad Academy School
 Al Kon International School

Libraries
The central library at King Abdulaziz University (main branch) is a five-story building that has a large collection of Arabic and English language books, rare books, and documents as well as access to several online databases. It is open for public access and allows the borrowing of books after requesting a library card. Saturdays are dedicated to female visitors.

King Abdul Aziz Public Library is a philanthropic institution that was founded and supported by the Custodian of the Two Holy Mosques King Abdullah Bin Abdulaziz, chairman of its board of directors. Established in 1985, the library was officially opened by the King on 27 February 1987. It emphasizes Islamic and Arabic heritage and history of the Kingdom. The library is divided into three branches (men's, women's, and children's).

The limited number of libraries is criticized by the public. As a result, King Abdullah, Custodian of the Two Holy Mosques, has approved the King Abdullah Project for the Development of Public Libraries, and approximately SAR150 million is budgeted to be spent.

In April 2014, Prince Mishaal Ibn Abdullah Abdulaziz opened a new public library in Jeddah by Makkah Governor, under the name of King Fahd Public Library.

King Fahd Public Library was built over an area of  within the main Campus of King Abdulaziz University (KAU) in Jeddah. it includes a diverse collection of books and reference material classified into three sections to meet the needs and wants of a wide range of readership. Spaces have been set apart for youths, children and women.

Sports

Jeddah is the home of the two largest well-known football clubs teams, Al-Ittihad Club and Al-Ahli Saudi FC. Both teams play their league matches at King Abdullah Stadium, which is located northern part of Jeddah near King Abdelaziz Airport.
 
The city is home to the 2015 Saudi Arabian basketball Champion Al-Ittihad Jeddah, which plays its home games in the Prince Abdullah Al-Faisal Basketball Arena.

On 5 November 2020, it was announced that Jeddah will host the round of the 2021 FIA Formula 1 World Championship. The Jeddah Corniche Circuit is a street circuit, winding through the Jeddah Corniche along the Red Sea, north of the main part of the city. The race debuted on 5 December 2021, and is scheduled to be held in the city until 2025.

Transport

Airport

Jeddah is served by King Abdulaziz International Airport. The airport has four passenger terminals. One is the Hajj Terminal, a special outdoor terminal covered by large white tents, which was constructed to handle the more than two million pilgrims who pass through the airport during the Hajj season. The Southern Terminal is used by Saudia and Flynas (both based in Saudi Arabia), while the Northern Terminal serves foreign airlines. A plan for the extension of the airport is being developed. The Royal Terminal is a special terminal reserved for VIPs, foreign kings and presidents, and the Saudi royal family. A portion of the airport, King Abdullah Air Base, was used by Coalition B-52 heavy bombers during Operation Desert Storm in 1991.

Before King Abdulaziz Airport opened in 1981, Kandara Airport served Jeddah. It was at Kandara, a neighborhood very near the town center. However, the old Jeddah airport experienced heavy congestions, especially during Hajj seasons. After the airport became defunct, the area was redeveloped for housing.

Seaport

The Jeddah Seaport is the 32nd busiest seaport in the world . It handles the majority of Saudi Arabia's commercial movement.

In 2017 Jeddah seaport handled 4,309,765 TEUs and in the year 2018 handled 4,215,248 TEUs.

Jeddah is part of the 21st Century Maritime Silk Road that runs from the Chinese coast to the Upper Adriatic region with its rail connections to Central and Eastern Europe.

Road and rail

Highway 40, which begins in Jeddah, connects the city to Mecca, Riyadh and Dammam on the east coast. Jeddah does not have any rapid transit system, but the Haramain High Speed Rail Project provides a connection to Mecca and Medina. There is a contracted plan to build an extensive light metro system known as the Jeddah Metro, throughout the city, originally by 2020. Jeddah's main highways run parallel to each other.

Issues and challenges
The city is challenged by pollution, weak sewage systems, a weak storm drain system that led to massive floodings, heavy traffic, epidemics, and water shortages.

Pollution and environment
Air pollution is a problem for Jeddah, particularly on hot summer days. The city has experienced bush fires, landfill fires, and pollution from the two industrial zones in the north and the south of the metropolitan area. A water treatment factory and the seaport also contribute to water pollution. Much of the seafront, however, is considered to be safe and clean. Ramboll has acted as Environmental Consultant on the Jeddah Environmental Impact Assessment as well as the Jeddah Environmental Social Masterplan.

Terrorism
On 6 December 2004, a group of five men associated with the terrorist group Al-Qaeda (Al-Qaeda Organization in the Arabian Peninsula) conducted a mid-day attack on the U.S. Consulate, which killed five Consulate workers. The group was led by Fayez ibn Awwad Al-Jeheni, a former member of the Saudi religious police. Two other assailants were subsequently identified by the Saudi authorities as residents of Jeddah's Al-Jamia suburb and other slums on Saudi Arabia's increasingly urbanized west coast. Buildings were attacked, hostages taken and used as human shields, and the U.S. and non-U.S. staff were under siege, although the chancery/consular section building itself was never penetrated. Closed-circuit video feeds documented that the Saudi security personnel assigned to protect the facility fled when the vehicle holding the terrorists pulled up to the front gate and ran past the Delta barrier. Inside the compound, however, an armed Saudi security guard employed by the embassy shot and killed one terrorist before being fatally shot himself.

The attackers spread and ignited a flammable liquid on the front of the chancery building, and opened fire on the front doors, both of which actions did not have any penetrating effect. The Consulate's U.S. Marines released tear gas in front of the chancery building, but the terrorists had already left that location. More than an hour later, Saudi special forces made it through traffic and, along with others from their unit who arrived in a helicopter, fought to retake the compound. Two of the terrorists were killed in the final fight, with another dying later in hospital and the final militant being captured alive. Four Saudi special forces and a further 10 hostages were wounded in the crossfire.

The five Foreign Service National employees who died during the terrorist attack were Ali Yaslem Bin Talib, Imad e-Deen Musa Ali, Romeo de la Rosa, Mohammed Baheer Uddin, and Jaufar Sadik. The casualties came from Yemen, Sudan, Philippines, India and Sri Lanka.

The attack underscores the ongoing vulnerabilities of Westerners to threats, terrorist actions, and the environs. In a communiqué posted in online publications such as Sawt al-Jihad (Voice of Jihad) and Mu'askar al-Battar (Al-Battar Training Camp), Al-Qaeda hinted at the symbolic nature of the U.S. Consulate attack, stating: "Know that the Mujahideen are determined to continue on their path, and they will not be weakened by what has happened to them."

Terrorist activities have persisted from 2004 to the present day. In 2004, there was an unsuccessful shooting attack on a U.S. Marine visiting the Saudi American Bank and an attempt to simultaneously explode car bombs at Saudi American Bank and Saudi British Bank branches in Jeddah on the anniversary of the 2001 "9-11" terrorist attacks on the U.S. On 26 August 2012, a spokesman for the Interior Ministry announced that terrorists were arrested in Jeddah who had been preparing explosives for attacks within the kingdom.

In 2022, the Houthis launched a missile attack to an Aramco facility near the Jeddah circuit, where the Formula One Saudi Arabian Grand Prix was held.

Traffic
Roads and highways within and exiting the city are frequently clogged with traffic. Mass transit is rare and planning is nascent; most Jeddawi adults have at least one car. Motorcycles are rare on the roads, further impacting the traffic patterns. Days immediately preceding and following the holy days are particularly noisome and cost hundreds of thousands of man-hours because of traffic jams. The Saudi Gazette reports that there is a plan in the works to tackle the traffic issue. A reported 3 billion Saudi Riyals will be put into constructing flyovers and underpasses in an effort to expedite traffic. The plan is scheduled to take about five years from its start to finish.

Sewage
Prior to the construction of a waste treatment plant, Jeddah's wastewater was disposed of by either discharge into the sea or via absorption into deep underground pits. However, even with the ever-increasing population, the original sewer system has hardly been expanded. The original plant cannot cope with the amount of waste inundating it daily. As a result, some untreated sewage is discharged directly into the sea and the entire northern part of the city remains completely unconnected to the sewage system, instead of relying on septic tanks. This has been responsible for a large number of sewage tankers.

In late 2011, a storm drainage system was built in the south Jeddah area (similar to that of the Los Angeles storm drain) to reduce the risk of floods.

Floods

On 25 November 2009, heavy floods affected the city and other areas of Makkah Province. The floods were described by civil defence officials as the worst in 27 years. , 77 people were reported to have been killed, and more than 350 were missing. Some roads were under a meter (three feet) of water on 26 November, and many of the victims were believed to have drowned in their cars. At least 3,000 vehicles were swept away or damaged. The death toll was expected to rise as flood waters receded, allowing rescuers to reach stranded vehicles.

On 26 January 2011, again, heavy floods affected the city and other areas of Makkah Province. The cumulative rainfall exceeded the  recorded in four hours during the 25 November 2009 flash floods. Streets including Palestine Street, Madinah Road, and Wali Al-Ahad Street were either flooded or jammed with traffic. Cars were seen floating in some places. Meanwhile, eyewitnesses told local newspaper Arab News that East Jeddah was swamped and floodwater was rushing west towards the Red Sea, turning streets into rivers once again.

On 17 November 2015, heavy floods affected the city. Streets affected by the flood include Palestine Street, Madinah Road, and many others. Cars were seen burning, and many trees fell as a result of the violent flood. 3 deaths were also reported. 2 of the fatalities (including a child) were hit by lightning while crossing a street.

On 21 November 2017, heavy floods affected the city once more and Jeddah Islamic Port stopped operations for about 3 hours. Jeddah police received 11,000 phone calls on 911 from people enquiring about alternative roads and weather conditions. There were 250 reports of electrocution. Five people were electrocuted, two died.
 

On 24 November 2022, heavy floods affected mainly in Jeddah. Jeddah was heavily damaged from the flood and cause more than thousands of cars to be damaged by the flood and caused power outage to most of the city and the flood was approximately 1-2 meters high. Which caused flights delayed and school closed and 2 people killed.

Districts
Metropolitan Jeddah comprises 137 districts (transliterated from Arabic):

 Al-Murjan (The Coral)
 Al-Basateen (The Orchards)
 Al-Mohamadiya (Of Mohammed)
 Ash-Shati (The Beach)
 An-Nahda (The Renaissance)
 An-Naeem (The Bliss)
 An-Nuzha (The Excursion) 
 Az-Zahraa (from Fatima Az-Zahraa)
 As-Salamah (The Safety)
 Al-Bawadi
 Ar-Rabwa (The Hill)
 Al-Safa
 Al-Khalidiya (Of Khalid)
 Ar-Rawdha (The Medow)
 Al-Faysaliya (Of Faisal)
 Al-Andalus (Andalucia)
 Al-Aziziya (Of Aziz "Abdulaziz")
 Ar-Rihab (The Vast Expanse)
 Al-Hamraa (The Red or Alhambra)
 Mosharafa 
 Ar-Ruwais
 Ash-Sharafiya (Of The Shareef)
 Bani Malik
 Al-Woroud (The Flowers)
 An-Naseem (The Breeze)
 Al-Baghdadiya Ash-Sharqiya (Of East Baghdad)
 Al-Amariya (Of Ammar)
 Al-Hindawiya
 As-Saheifa
 Al-Kandra
 As-Sulaimaniya (Of Sulaiman/Solomon)
 Al-Thaalba (The Foxes)
 As-Sabeel (The Path)
 Al-Qurayat
 Gholail
 An-Nozla Al-Yamaniya 
 Al-Nozla Ash-Sharqiya
 Al-Taghr (The Stoma)
 Al-Jamaa (The University; due to its proximity to King Abdulaziz University)
 Madayin Al-Fahad (The Cities of Fahad)
 Ar-Rawabi
 Al-Wazeeriya (The Ministerial)
 Petromin
 Al-Mahjar (The Stone Pit)
 Prince Abdel Majeed
 Obhour Al-Janobiya (South of the Obhur Bay)
 Al-Marwa
 AL-Fayhaa
 King Abdul Al-Aziz University
 Al-Baghdadiya Al-Gharbiya (Of West Baghdad)
 Al-Balad (The City)
 Al-Ajwad
 Al-Manar
 As-Samer
 Abruq Ar-Roghama
 Madinat As-Sultan
 Um Hablain
 Al-Hamdaniya
 Al-Salhiya
 Mokhatat Al-Aziziya
 Mokhatat Shamal Al-Matar
 Mokhatat Ar-Riyadh
 Mokhatat Al-Huda
 Braiman
 Al-Salam
 Al-Mostawdaat
 Al-Montazahat
 Kilo 14
 Al-Harazat
 Um As-Salam
 Mokhtat Zahrat Ash-Shamal
 Al-Majid
 Gowieza
 Al-Gozain
 Al-Kuwait
 Al-Mahrogat
 Al-Masfa
 Al-Matar Al-Gadeem (old airport)
 Al-Bokhariya
 An-Nour
 Bab Shareif
 Bab Makkah
 Bahra
 Al-Amir Fawaz
 Wadi Fatma
 Obhour Shamaliya
 At-Tarhil (deportation)
 Al-Iskan Al-janoubi
 At-Tawfeeq
 Al-Goaid
 Al-Jawhara
 Al-Jamoum
 Al-Khumra
 Ad-Difaa Al-Jawi (Air Defense)
 Ad-Dageeg
 Ar-Robou
 Ar-Rabie
 Ar-Rehaily
 As-Salmiya
 As-Sanabil
 As-Sinaiya (Bawadi)
 Industrial City (Mahjar)
 Al-Adl
 Al-Olayia
 Al-Faihaa
 Al-Karanteena
 Al-Ajaweed
 Al-Ahmadiya
 Al-Mosadiya
 East Al-Khat As-Sarei
 Kilo 10
 King Faisal Navy Base
 Kilo 7
 Kilo 45
 King Faisal Guard City
 Kilo 11
 Thowal
 Kilo 13
 Al-Makarona
 Al-Layth
 Al-Gonfoda
 Rabegh
 Kilo 8
 Kilo 5
 Kilo 2
 Al-Mokhwa
 National Guard Residence
 As-Showag
 Air Defense Residence
 Al-Morsalat
 Ash-Shoola
 Al-Corniche
 Al-Waha
 Mokhatat Al-Haramain
 Kholais
 Al-Rhmanya
 Wadi al batin
 AL MADINAH
 JUDAYYIADAT ARAR
 AS SALWA
 al huda

Twin towns – sister cities

Jeddah is twinned with:

  Adana, Turkey
  Alexandria, Egypt
  Almaty, Kazakhstan
  Amman, Jordan
  Baku, Azerbaijan
  Chittagong, Bangladesh
  Dubai, United Arab Emirates
  Istanbul, Turkey
  Jakarta, Indonesia
  Karachi, Pakistan
  Kuching, Malaysia
  Marbella, Spain
  Mary, Turkmenistan
  Oran, Algeria
  Osh, Kyrgyzstan 
  Plovdiv, Bulgaria
  Surabaya, Indonesia
  Taipei, Taiwan
  Tunis, Tunisia

See also

 Abha
 Bibliography of the history of Jeddah
 Karantina
 Khobar 
 List of cities and towns in Saudi Arabia

Citations

General and cited sources 

 Didier, Charles. Séjour Chez Le Grand-Cherif De La Mekke. Librairie De L. Hachette et, Rue Pierre.
 Didier, Charles. Rehla Ela Al-Hejaz: A Trip to Hejaz. Translated from Séjour Chez Le Grand-Cherif De La Mekke into Arabic. Paris, 1854. .
 Facey, William & Grant, Gillian. Saudi Arabia by the First Photographers. 
 Farsi, Hani M.S. (Mohamed Said). Jeddah: city of art: the sculptures and monuments. London: Stacey International, 1991. .
 From Bullard to Mr Chamberlain. Jeddah, 1925 Feb. (No.# secrets) - Archived Post.
 Froster, Captain G. S. A trip Across the Peninsula - Rehla Abr Al-Jazeera. Mombai, India, 1866.
 El-Hage, Badr. Saudi Arabia: caught in time 1861-1939. Published by Garnet, Reading, 1997. .
 Al-Harbi, Dalal. King Abdulaziz and his Strategies to deal with events: Events of Jeddah. King Abdulaziz National Library, 2003. .
 Keane, John F. Six months in the Hejaz: journeys to Makkah and Madinah 1877-1989. Manchester: Barzan Publishing, 2006. .
 Al-Khaldi, Ibrahim. The Bedouin Photographer - Al-Mosawwir Al-Badawi. Kuwait, 2004.
 Maneval, Stefan. 2019. New Islamic Urbanism: The Architecture of Public and Private Space in Jeddah, Saudi Arabia. London: UCL Press. .
 Al-Rehani. Nejd and Its Followers.
 Tarabulsi, Mohammed Yosuf. Jeddah: A Story of a City. Riyadh: King Fahd National Library, 2006. .
 Al-Turki, Thuraya. Jeddah: Um Al-Rakha wal Sheddah. Published by Dar Al-Shrooq.

External links

 Municipality of Jeddah Official municipality website 
 Principality of Jeddah Official Jeddah principality website 
 City of Jeddah Official website 

 
Populated coastal places in Saudi Arabia
Populated places established in the 6th century BC
Populated places in Mecca Province
Port cities in the Arabian Peninsula
Port cities and towns in Saudi Arabia
Port cities and towns of the Red Sea
Underwater diving sites in Saudi Arabia
World Heritage Sites in Saudi Arabia